Harold Montague Bulling (18909 November 1933) was an English footballer who played in the Football League.

Harold Bulling joined Watford in 1911 and made 99 Southern League appearances for them. He played at right back in all but 3 games in Watford's 1914/15 Southern League Championship winning season.

Bulling played for Nottingham Forest between 1919 and 1925.

Bulling served in The King's (Liverpool Regiment) during the First World War.

References

English footballers
Association football defenders
English Football League players
Nottingham Forest F.C. players
Watford F.C. players
1890 births
1933 deaths